Pamulparthy Swaroop Reddy (born 1949) is an Indian judge. He is serving on the Andhra Pradesh High Court.

References

External links

1949 births
Living people
Osmania University alumni
Judges of the Andhra Pradesh High Court
20th-century Indian judges